Elijah Paine (January 21, 1757 – April 28, 1842) was a justice of the Supreme Court of Vermont, a United States senator from Vermont and a United States district judge of the United States District Court for the District of Vermont.

Education and career

Born on January 21, 1757, in Brooklyn, Connecticut Colony, British America, Paine attended the public schools and served in the Continental Army from 1776 to 1777, during the American Revolutionary War. He received an Artium Baccalaureus degree in 1781 from Harvard University and read law in 1784. He was admitted to the bar and entered private practice in Windsor, Vermont from 1784 to 1787. He cultivated a farm and began a settlement at Williamstown, Vermont. He established a cloth factory and a saw and grist mill in Northfield, Vermont. He was secretary of the Vermont constitutional convention in 1786. He was a member of the Vermont House of Representatives from 1787 to 1789. He was a Judge of the Probate Court for the Randolph District of Vermont from 1788 to 1791. He was a justice of the Supreme Court of Vermont from 1791 to 1793.

Congressional service

Paine was elected to the United States Senate from Vermont in 1794. He was reelected as a Federalist in 1800 and served from March 4, 1795, to September 1, 1801, when he resigned to accept a federal judicial post.

Federal judicial service

Paine was nominated by President John Adams on February 24, 1801, to a seat on the United States District Court for the District of Vermont vacated by Judge Samuel Hitchcock. He was confirmed by the United States Senate on February 25, 1801, and received his commission on March 3, 1801. His service terminated on April 1, 1842, due to his resignation.

Other service

Concurrent with his federal judicial service, Paine served as Postmaster of Williamstown, Vermont from 1815 to 1842.

Death

Paine died on April 28, 1842, in Williamstown. He was interred in West Hill Cemetery in Williamstown.

Family

The son of Seth Paine, Paine married Sarah Porter of Plymouth, New Hampshire. They had four sons; Martin Paine, an eminent physician; Elijah Paine Jr., a judge of the New York Supreme Court; George Paine, a prominent lawyer; and Charles Paine, who was Governor of Vermont from 1841 to 1843.

Memberships

Paine was elected a Fellow of the American Academy of Arts and Sciences in 1812, and a member of the American Antiquarian Society in 1813.

See also
List of United States federal judges by longevity of service

References

Sources

 
 Govtrack US Congress
 
 The Political Graveyard
 

1757 births
1842 deaths
People from Brooklyn, Connecticut
People of colonial Connecticut
American people of English descent
Federalist Party United States senators from Vermont
Vermont Federalists
Members of the Vermont House of Representatives
Justices of the Vermont Supreme Court
Judges of the United States District Court for the District of Vermont
United States federal judges appointed by John Adams
18th-century American judges
United States federal judges admitted to the practice of law by reading law
Harvard College alumni
Fellows of the American Academy of Arts and Sciences
Members of the American Antiquarian Society
Continental Army soldiers